Xiaonan Lu is a Canadian chemist and microbiologist. He is an associate professor at the Faculty of Agricultural and Environmental Sciences of McGill University who is active in the field of food science.

Awards 
 Young Scientist Excellence Award - International Union of Food Science and Technology (2015)
 Larry Beuchat Young Researcher Award - International Association for Food Protection (2017)

See also 
 Roman M. Balabin
 Colm O'Donnell

References

Literature 
 Brandie Weikle (2016-12-02) Is chocolate really good for you? UBC scientists make new tool to measure antioxidants // CBC/Radio-Canada.
 Anna Dimoff (2018-01-26) DNA barcoding reveals widespread seafood fraud in Metro Vancouver // CBC/Radio-Canada.

Web-sources 
 

Living people
Canadian chemists
Academic staff of the University of British Columbia
Year of birth missing (living people)